Varda Space Industries is a privately held American space research company headquartered in Torrance, California. Founded in 2020, the company aims to build the first space station dedicated to industrial use, which will take advantage of microgravity to manufacture fine goods that are difficult to produce in Earth's gravity. Investors in the company include venture capitalists such as Khosla Ventures and Peter Thiel's Founders Fund.

History 
Varda Space was founded in November 2020 by Will Bruey, Delian Asparouhov, and Daniel Marshall. Will Bruey is a former employee of SpaceX, and Asparouhov and Marshall are associated with Founders Fund. Varda Space began research into building an industrial space station. The microgravity environment and absence of dust particles allows for the manufacturability of fine technical products such as computer chips with higher precision and quality than on Earth's surface. This regime also allows for the manufacture of completely new materials and products there, including fiber optics and pharmaceuticals. In July 2021, Varda Space received US$42 million in a funding round from various venture capitalists, after receiving US$9 million in an initial funding round in December 2020.

In August 2021, Varda Space announced that it had signed a contract with Rocket Lab to acquire three Photon satellite buses to carry out missions to build the space station. The first delivery is expected in Q1 2023.

See also 
 Space Forge
 Space manufacturing

References 

SpaceX people
Space manufacturing
2020 establishments in California
Companies based in Torrance, California
American companies established in 2020
Proposed space stations